Paul P. Haney was an American journalist and public affairs officer for NASA. He was the voice of mission control for the Gemini and Apollo programs.

References 

2009 deaths